Hu Hu Hu is the third album by Mexican singer-songwriter Natalia Lafourcade, released in May 2009 after an almost four years hiatus from popular music. (She had released a classical EP, Las 4 Estaciones Del Amor in 2008.) Lafourcade decided to name the album "Hu Hu Hu" because she perceived the phrase to be "an expression of joy".

The album was produced by Emmanuel del Real (who produced "Casa" in 2005), Marco Moreno and Ernesto García. The album was nominated for Best female Pop Vocal Album at the 2009 Latin Grammy Awards (won by Laura Pausini) and Best Latin Pop album at the 2010 Grammy Awards (won by La Quinta Estación). Club Fonograma also named the album the 2nd best of 2009, and the 7th best of the decade.

CD artwork
The cover showed Lafourcade wearing a large headpiece of lynx's head. Animals were featured elsewhere in the artwork and promotional materials. An owl was featured in her Myspace page, and a lynx in her YouTube channel. Federico Escoto and Roberto Carrara designed the artwork.

Promotion 

"Azul" was the first single alternative, was a theme designed for the EP Instrumental The 4 seasons of love and purpose of the project was not integrated to it. "Azul" was not supported by her record label, had an independent promotion by Natalia only (by choice), so she included it in her playlist on her MySpace. It achieved great acceptance by fans, and for that reason she decided to create the video with her friends and present it to her YouTube channel.

Single

The first official single entitled "Ella Es Bonita" which began in early March advertise on radio and television stations. The video was recorded in Monterrey.

Her second single being promoted is called "Cursis Melodías"
Posted on their MySpace demos of some of these songs and interviews on radio stations such as reactors and Interference sounded the final versions of the disk for editing.

"No Viniste" is the third single released at the same time redición album in 2010, the video was launched on 10 August that year.

Track listing
The standard album has 13 songs written by Natalia Lafourcade and 2 collaborations. The special edition album features 16 songs, including remixes and live songs with guest artists, recorded at the Teatro Fru Fru of Mexico City.

Charts

References

Natalia Lafourcade albums
2009 albums
Sony Music Mexico albums